False Dmitry II (died ), historically known as Pseudo-Demetrius II and also called "тушинский вор" ("rebel/criminal of Tushino"), was the second of three pretenders to the Russian throne who claimed to be Tsarevich Dmitry Ivanovich, the youngest son of Ivan the Terrible, during the Time of Troubles. The real Dmitry had died under uncertain circumstances, most likely an assassination in 1591 at the age of nine at his widowed mother's appanage residence in Uglich.

The second False Dmitry first appeared on the scene around 20 July 1607, at Starodub. He is believed to have been either a priest's son or a converted Jew, and was relatively highly educated for the time. He spoke both the Russian and Polish languages and was something of an expert in liturgical matters. He pretended at first to be the Muscovite boyar Nagoy, but falsely confessed under torture that he was Tsarevich Dmitry, whereupon he was taken at his word and joined by thousands of Cossacks, Poles, and Muscovites.

Dunning states, "According tradition, the future 'Tsar Dmitrii' was at the time of his 'discovery' a priest's servant and teacher who lived for some time in the town of Shklov in Belorussia." In the winter of 1606-7, unemployed and reduced to begging, Pan Miechowikci noticed the beggar looked similar to Dmitrii, and eventually convinced the beggar to lean the role of "Dmitrii." In May 1607, accompanied by two aides, the impostor crossed the border and made his way to Starodub.

In 1608, following a peace agreement with King Sigismund, Tsar Vasilii agreed to release Tsar Dmitrii's father-in-law, Jerzy Mniszech, and widow, Marina Mniszech. They soon joined the second false Dmitrii's camp in Tushino, where she "recognized" her late husband in this second Dmitry. According to Dunning, "On the Tushino impostor's boyar council sat such powerful men as Mikhail G. Saltykov and Dmitrii Trubetskoi. They were soon joined by several of Tsar Dmitrii's former courtiers, including Grigorii Shakhovskoi and Mikhail Molchanov. The Saltykov and Romanov families were by far the most influential Russians in Tushino. The arrival in Tushino of Jan Piotr Sapieha with seven thousand cavalrymen  in August speeded up rebel military activity."

He quickly captured Karachev, Bryansk, and other towns, was reinforced by the Poles, and in the spring of 1608 advanced upon Moscow, routing the army of Tsar Vasili Shuisky at Bolkhov. Promises of the wholesale confiscation of the estates of the boyars drew many common people to his side. The village of Tushino, twelve versts from the capital, was converted into an armed camp where Dmitry gathered his army. His force initially included 7,000 Polish soldiers, 10,000 Cossacks and 10,000 other rag-tag soldiers, including former members of the failed Zebrzydowski Rebellion. His forces soon exceeded 100,000 men. He raised to the rank of patriarch another illustrious captive, Philaret Romanov, and won the allegiance of the cities of Yaroslavl, Kostroma, Vologda, Kashin and several others. 

The arrival of King Sigismund III Vasa at Smolensk caused a majority of his Polish supporters to desert him and join with the armies of the Polish king. At the same time, a strong Russo-Swedish army under Mikhail Skopin-Shuisky and Jacob De la Gardie approached Tushino, forcing him to flee his camp disguised as a peasant and go to Kostroma, where Marina joined him and he lived once more in regal state. He made another unsuccessful attack on Moscow, and, supported by the Don Cossacks, recovered a hold over all south-eastern Russia. However, he was killed, while half drunk, on 11 December 1610 by a Tatar princeling, Peter Urusov, whom he had flogged. Hetman Stanisław Żółkiewski described this event in his memoirs:

See also 
False Dmitry I
False Dmitry III

Notes

Further reading
 Bibliography of Russian history (1613–1917)
 Bibliography of Russian history (1223–1613)

1610 deaths
False Dmitrys
Year of birth unknown
Russian murder victims
Deaths by decapitation
1582 births
Impostors
Vasili IV of Russia